Mr. District Attorney is a 1947 American crime film directed by Robert B. Sinclair and starring Dennis O'Keefe, Adolphe Menjou and Marguerite Chapman. The film was based on the long-running and popular radio series Mr. District Attorney created by Phillips Lord.

Plot
An assistant district attorney becomes involved with a woman who works for the group that he is investigating.

Cast 
 Dennis O'Keefe as Steve Bennett 
 Adolphe Menjou as Craig Warren 
 Marguerite Chapman as Marcia Manning 
 Michael O'Shea as Harrington 
 George Coulouris as James Randolph 
 Jeff Donnell as Miss Miller 
 Steven Geray as Berotti 
 Ralph Morgan as Ed Jamison 
 John Kellogg as Franzen

References

Bibliography
 Blottner, Gene. Columbia Noir: A Complete Filmography, 1940–1962. McFarland, 2015.

External links
 

1947 films
1947 crime drama films
American crime drama films
Columbia Pictures films
Films directed by Robert B. Sinclair
Films scored by Herschel Burke Gilbert
American black-and-white films
1940s English-language films
1940s American films